Caroline Bonde Holm (born 19 July 1990) is a Danish athlete who competes in the pole vault. She competed in the Women's pole vault at the 2012 Summer Olympics.

Competition record

References

External links
 

1990 births
Living people
Danish female pole vaulters
Olympic athletes of Denmark
Athletes (track and field) at the 2012 Summer Olympics